Antanas Janauskas  (June 20, 1937 – February 23, 2016) was a Lithuanian animation film director, designer and writer.

In 1970, he created the first Lithuanian film studio animated movie The Initiative, whose theme was inspired by Prague Spring events. He has directed numerous animated films and documentaries.

Filmography
Atspaudas (1986) 
Užkrečiantis pavyzdys (1987) 
Palankios aplinkybės (1989)
Kėdė (1995)
Ovacijos (1998)
Telegastrovizija (2000)
Trumpas sujungimas (2003)
Užsisek saugos diržą! (1996)
Perėja (1998)

References

Lithuanian animated film directors
1937 births
2016 deaths
Lithuanian screenwriters
Male screenwriters
Lithuanian male writers